The following is a discography of production by 40.

Singles produced

2002

Empire -  Runamuk: The Intro  
01. "Intro"
02. "Walk On Y'all"
03. "Runamuk Rappers"
04. "Once Again From the Top"
05. "Buddah Session"
06. "I'm Pissed"
07. "Wack"
08. "Bonus - (Fatal Phonetics Diss)"

2005

Divine Brown - Divine Brown 
 02. "Twist My Hair" (Produced with Divine Brown)
 04. "Help Me" (Produced with Divine Brown)
 08. "Another Affair" (Produced with Big Soxx)

2007

JDiggz - Memoirs of a Playbwoy 
 07. "With You" (feat. George Nozuka)
 10. "Come Home With Me" (feat. Cory Lee)
 13. "With You (Remix)" (feat. Drake & George Nozuka)

2009

Drake - So Far Gone 
 01. "Lust For Life"
  Sample Credit: "Ideas as Opiates" by Tears for Fears 
 02. "Houstatlantavegas"
 03. "Successful" (feat. Trey Songz & Lil Wayne)
 07. "A Night Off" (feat. Lloyd)
  Sample Credit: "Between the Sheets" by The Isley Brothers 
 13. "Sooner than Later" 
 14. "Bria's Interlude" (feat. Omarion)
  Sample Credit: "Friendly Skies" by Missy Elliott 
 15. "The Calm"

Trey Songz - Ready 
 12. "Successful" (feat. Drake)

Drake - So Far Gone 
 01. "Houstatlantavegas"
 02. "Successful" (feat. Trey Songz & Lil Wayne)
 06. "The Calm"

Lil Wayne - No Ceilings 
 20. "I'm Single" (produced with Omen)

Lloyd - Like Me: The Young Goldie EP 
 08. "A Night Off" (feat. Drake)
  Sample Credit: "Between the Sheets" by The Isley Brothers

Alicia Keys - The Element of Freedom 
 07. "Un-Thinkable (I'm Ready)"

2010

Drake - Thank Me Later 
 01. "Fireworks" (feat. Alicia Keys) (Produced with Boi-1da & Crada)
 03. "The Resistance" 
 07. "Fancy" (feat. T.I. & Swizz Beatz) (Produced with Swizz Beatz)
 Sample Credit: "I Don't Want To Play Around" by Ace Spectrum
 08. "Shut It Down" (feat. The-Dream) (Produced with Omen)
 09. "Unforgettable" (feat. Young Jeezy) (Produced with Boi-1da)
 Sample Credit: "At Your Best (You Are Love)" by Aaliyah 
 10. "Light Up" (feat. Jay-Z) (Produced with Tone Mason)
 11. "Miss Me" (feat. Lil Wayne) (Produced with Boi-1da)
 Sample Credit: "Wild Flower" by Hank Crawford
 12. "Cece's Interlude"

Trey Songz - Passion, Pain & Pleasure 
 15. "Unfortunate"
 16. "Blind"

Lil Wayne - I Am Not a Human Being 
 05. "I'm Single" (Produced with Omen)

Jamie Foxx - Best Night of My Life 
 08. "Fall for Your Type" (feat. Drake) (Produced with Rico Love & Drake)

2011

Sade - The Ultimate Collection (Disc 2) 
 14. "The Moon and the Sky (Remix)" (feat. Jay-Z)

DJ Khaled - We the Best Forever 
 01. "I'm On One" (feat. Drake, Rick Ross & Lil Wayne) (Produced with T-Minus & Kromatik)

Drake - Take Care 
 01. "Over My Dead Body" (Produced with Chantal Kreviazuk)
 Sample Credit: "Sailin' Da South" by DJ Screw
 02. "Shot For Me"
 Sample Credit: "Anything" by SWV
 03. "Headlines" (Produced with Boi-1da)
 04. "Crew Love" (feat. The Weeknd) (Produced with Illangelo & The Weeknd)
 06. "Marvins Room"
 07. "Buried Alive (Interlude)" (feat. Kendrick Lamar) (Produced with Supa Dups)
 08. "Under Ground Kings" (Produced with T-Minus)
 Sample Credit: "Farmers Pleasure" by Jah Cure
 09. "We'll Be Fine" (feat. Birdman) (Produced with T-Minus)
 12. "Cameras / Good Ones Go (Interlude)" ("Cameras" Produced with Drake)
 Sample Credit: "Calling on You" by Jon B.
 13. "Doing It Wrong"
 14. "The Real Her" (feat. Lil Wayne & André 3000) (Produced with Drake)
 15. "Look What You've Done" (Produced with Chase N. Cashe)
 Sample Credit: "If U Scared, Say U Scared" by Playa
 17. "Practice" (Produced with Drake)
 Sample Credit: "Back That Thang Up" by Juvenile
 20. "Hate Sleeping Alone" (Deluxe Edition Bonus Track)

2012

Tyga - Careless World: Rise of the Last King 
 22. "Still Got It" (feat. Drake) (Produced with Supa Dups) (Deluxe Edition Bonus Track)

Melanie Fiona - The MF Life 
 04. "I Been That Girl" (Produced by T-Minus, Vocal Production by 40)

Usher - Looking 4 Myself 
 09. "What Happened to U" (Produced with Omen)
 Sample Credit: "One More Chance" by The Notorious B.I.G.

Nas - Life Is Good 
 14. "Bye Baby" (Produced with Salaam Remi)
 Sample Credit: "Goodbye Love" by Guy

2 Chainz - Based on a T.R.U. Story 
 04. "No Lie" (feat. Drake) (Produced by Mike WiLL Made It, Co-Produced by Marz, Drake's Vocal Production by 40)

2013

ASAP Rocky - Long. Live. ASAP 
 07. "Fuckin' Problems" (feat. Drake, 2 Chainz & Kendrick Lamar) (Produced with C. Papi)

Drake - Nothing Was the Same 
 01. "Tuscan Leather"
 02. "Furthest Thing" (Co-Produced by Jake One)
 03. "Started from the Bottom (Produced by Mike Zombie, Additional Production by 40)
 04. "Wu-Tang Forever"
 05. "Own It" (Produced by Detail, Additional Production by 40)
 07. "From Time" (feat. Jhené Aiko) (Produced with Chilly Gonzales)
 08. "Hold On, We're Going Home" (feat. Majid Jordan) (produced by Nineteen85 & Majid Jordan, Additional Production by 40)
 09. "Connect" (Co-Produced by Hudson Mohawke)
 14. "Come Thru"
 15. "All Me" (feat. 2 Chainz & Big Sean) (produced by KeY Wane, Additional Production by 40)
 16. "The Motion" (feat. Sampha) (produced by Sampha, additional production by 40)

DJ Khaled - Suffering from Success 
 09. "No New Friends" (feat. Drake, Rick Ross & Lil Wayne)  (produced with Boi-1da)

Beyoncé - Beyoncé 
09. "Mine" (feat. Drake) (additional production by Majid Jordan & Omen, vocal production by Beyoncé Knowles)

2014

Young Money - Young Money: Rise of an Empire 
02. "Trophies" (feat. Drake) (produced by Hit-Boy, co-produced by 40 & Hagler)

2015

Action Bronson - Mr. Wonderful 
04. "Actin Crazy" (produced with Omen)

Drake - If You're Reading This It's Too Late 
 06. "Madonna"
 12. "6 Man" (Co-Produced by Daxz)
 15. "You & the 6" (Produced by Boi-1da, Co-Produced by Illmind & 40)
 16. "Jungle"

Drake & Future - What a Time to Be Alive 
 11. "30 for 30 Freestyle"

2016

Majid Jordan - Majid Jordan 
 03. "My Love" (feat. Drake) (produced by Nineteen85 & Illangelo, co-produced by Majid Jordan & 40)

Drake - Views
 2. "9" (produced with Boi-1da & Brian Alexander Morgan)
 3. "U with Me?" (produced with Kanye West, DJ Dahi, Ricci Riera, Vinylz, OZ, and Axelfolie)
 6. "Weston Road Flows" (produced with Stwo)
 7. "Redemption" (produced with Di Genius & Jordan McClure)
 9. "Faithful" (produced with Boi-1da & Nineteen85)
 10. "Still Here" (produced with Daxz)
 12. "One Dance" (featuring Wizkid and Kyla) (produced by Nineteen85, co-produced by 40 & Wizkid)
 13. "Grammys" (featuring Future) (produced with Southside, Cardo, & Yung Exclusive)
 14. "Child's Play" (additional production by Metro Boomin, Majid Jordan & Nineteen85)
 18. "Fire & Desire"

PartyNextDoor - PartyNextDoor 3
 15. "Come and See Me" (featuring Drake)

Uncertified 
 2010: Drake - "I Get Lonely Too"
 2011: Drake - "Dreams Money Can Buy"
  Sample Credit: "BTSTU" by Jai Paul 
 2011: Drake - "Trust Issues" (Produced with Adrian X)
 2011: Drake - "Club Paradise"
 2011: Drake - "Free Spirit" (feat. Rick Ross)
  Sample Credit: "I Will Be Your Friend" by Sade 
 2012: Riz - "Waiting Up" (feat. Drake)
 2012: JoJo - "Demonstrate"
 2012: Aaliyah - "Enough Said"  (feat. Drake) 
 2013: Eric Bellinger - "Ex Again" (feat. Jhené Aiko)
 2013: Drake - "Girls Love Beyoncé" (feat. James Fauntleroy)
2014: Drake - "Days In The East"  (Produced by PARTYNEXTDOOR, Co-produced by 40) 
2014: Drake - "0 to 100 / The Catch Up"  (Produced by Boi-1da, Co-produced by 40 & Nineteen85) 
2018: Pvrx - "Mixed by 40"

References

External links
Noah "40" Shebib at Discogs

Shebib
Shebib
Shebib